The Black Canyon Wilderness in the state of Nevada is a  wilderness area located in the Dry Lake Watershed along Dry Lake Valley at Black Canyon of the Colorado, west of the Great Basin Divide.  It is part of the Lake Mead National Recreation Area. Immediately to the south is the Eldorado Wilderness, in the El Dorado Mountains. Together, the two wilderness areas protect .

References

External links
 Black Canyon Wilderness - Lake Mead National Recreation Area
Information on Black Canyon Wilderness and its natural history, includes map & photos

Protected areas of Lincoln County, Nevada
Wilderness areas of Nevada
National Park Service areas in Nevada
Lake Mead National Recreation Area
Protected areas established in 2002
2002 establishments in Nevada